Castlefields may mean these places in England:
Castlefield, an area in Manchester
A suburb of Shrewsbury
An area in Stafford